Sambhu Saha (born 1 November 1925) was an Indian swimmer and water polo player. He competed in the men's tournament at the 1952 Summer Olympics.

References

External links
 

1925 births
Possibly living people
Indian male water polo players
Indian male swimmers
Indian male freestyle swimmers
Olympic water polo players of India
Water polo players at the 1952 Summer Olympics
Place of birth missing (living people)
Asian Games medalists in swimming
Asian Games bronze medalists for India
Swimmers at the 1951 Asian Games
Medalists at the 1951 Asian Games
20th-century Indian people